The Church of St Mark is a Church in Wales parish church located on Gold Tops, Newport, Wales. It is a Newport landmark and is part of the Benefice of the Cathedral parish of Newport.

History
The Victorian church was built in the 1870s due to the growing population of St Woolos' parish. The land upon which the church was built belonged to Charles Morgan, 1st Baron Tredegar but was donated to the church on condition that a total of £4000 be collected for the building work by the end of 1870. Even though the target was not reached by £1,000, the foundation stone was laid by Lady Tredegar on 20 July 1872. The church building was completed by 1874.

Present day
In 2013 there were fears that the church might have to close after the retirement of the then
Vicar, Canon Andrew Willie. The aging congregation had declined over the years, with the loss [before Canon Willie’s appointment in 1998] of the Choir, Youth Club and Men's Society. The Sunday School and Mothers’ Union membership shrank over the years. A huge renovation project had taken place in Canon Sharpe’s incumbency, but the structural difficulties of the church building were ongoing problems. Constant vigilance and regular expensive maintenance still are necessary to keep the building in good order. During Canon Willie’s incumbency the heating system was renewed, the church redecorated, masonry work refurbished and repointed where necessary, the fine three manual organ by Conacher was rebuilt by Nicholson's of Malvern, re-emergence of dry rot dealt with and a storage area made under the southwest aisle. As part of the wish to enhance the beauty of the church, quilted banners depicting the life of St Mark were commissioned. These were designed and made by church members, Mr Terry Wooff [who was also a Lay Reader in the parish], his wife Ida, and Mrs Myrna Brown. They hang on the balcony. Plaques, in danger of being lost forever, relating to the history of the City of Newport were recovered and placed in the church.

The Church Hall, some distance away from the Church, was at the mercy of vandalism and in need of considerable expensive work to bring it up to the required health and safety standards of a public building. It was sold and the money raised, together with the proceeds of parish fundraising events, used to revamp the interior of the church including alteration of the vestries to provide a buttery kitchen, secure vestry space and a meeting room. This work was completed in the summer of 2013. Other plans such as the removal of pews to create a community meeting space in the church were held up until the diocesan authorities agreed to the changes. There was also a need to raise funds elsewhere to enable the work to be completed. The time this took to achieve meant that Canon Willie, who took compulsory retirement at the age of 70 in 2013, did not see his vision come to fruition in his incumbency.

In 2014 the Revd Dr Paul Thompson was appointed and the parish went full circle by becoming joined again with the Cathedral as the parish boundaries were realigned. It is now considered the parish Church of the Cathedral ministry area with the Cathedral a stand-alone entity. Canon Thompson has brought his unique gifts and plans to boost up the parish and build on the groundwork done by his predecessors.

Notable clergy
 John Roland Lloyd Thomas, later Dean of Monmouth and subsequently Principal of St David’s College, Lampeter, was Vicar from 1949 to 1952
 Raymond Ellis Evans, later Dean of Monmouth, was Vicar in 1952 to 1953
 Noël Debroy Jones, later Bishop of Sodor and Mann, was assistant curate from 1957 to 1960
 Gareth Lewis, later Dean of Monmouth, was vicar from 1978 to 1982
 Kenneth Sharpe, later Archdeacon of Newport, was vicar from 1982 to 1997

References

Newport, St Mark
Newport
Newport, St Mark